<mapframe
text="McDonald Island"
width=200
height=240
zoom=12
latitude=-53.039694
longitude=72.592278/>
The McDonald Islands are an uninhabited archipelago in the southern Indian Ocean in the vicinity of Heard Island. Together with Heard Island, they make up the Australian external Territory of Heard Island and McDonald Islands. The McDonald Islands are the emergent peaks of submarine volcanoes and are Australian external territory. Prior to 1992, there had not been an eruption in the previous 75,000 years.

Morphology
The McDonald Islands comprise three islands: McDonald Island, Flat Island (which later merged with McDonald Island) and Meyer Rock. The islands are mostly composed of phonolitic low-silica pumice, dikes and lava domes, and sit atop a submarine plateau, the Kerguelen Plateau. They are located about 75 km from Heard Island.

It has been the main focus of volcanic activity in recent times. Prior to 1996, McDonald Island had been a flat green island whose pumice beaches provided a great nesting area for penguin breeding.

Eruptions
Prior to 1992, no eruptions had taken place at the McDonald Islands volcano for 75,000 years. A series of eruptions started in 1992.

1992 eruption
The first recorded eruption from the McDonalds was from a submarine vent (a small VEI-0 eruption) in December 1992. The eruption was probably the cause of pumice that washed up on the shore of Heard Island.

1996–1997 eruption
Fresh eruptions were reported in December 1996 when a vapour plume was noticed by an aeroplane pilot.

The plume was thought to have originated from Heard Island's Big Ben cone. However, on 18 March 1997 the crew of a passing ship heading for Heard Island reported that steam rose vigorously from a fissure on McDonald Island's steep north face; steam also vented from the island's north summit. Steam vented from a rubble-covered slope, indicating that a lava flow or pyroclastic flow had occurred.

On 2 April 1997, the crew of another ship noted that steam continued to vent from the fissure, rising from the summit and flanks of the island. That crew also observed lava flows travelling down gullies; the lava flows covered a significant area of the north part of the island. Sulphur deposits were also discovered and fresh pumice washed up on Heard Island. The eruption is estimated to have ended sometime in January–March 1997.

2001 eruption
Another eruption started at McDonald Island in 2001. The eruption was first sighted from a ship passing by the islands. Material was being ejected from the flanks of the island and also in the north and northwest of the island, and steam was issuing from near the summit crater. Work suggested that prior to the ship's visit, the volcano had been erupting, covering the island in dark, smooth material. Many features had been filled in, such as Williams Bay. A new volcanic cone had also been created. An observation made in November 2002 noted two new lava domes had been formed; their date of formation is unknown.

2005 eruption
Analysis of satellite imagery noted that an eruption took place on 12 July 2005 on the northwest shore of the island. The eruption may have added a small portion to the area of the island.

Heritage
In 2002 the Heard Island and McDonald Islands were declared a marine reserve; this was expanded in 2014. The islands are also recognised as a World Heritage Site.

Notes

References
 Global Volcanism Program
 VolcanoLive
 Official Heard Island and McDonald Islands page

External links
 Photo of the McDonald Islands in 2002 on Panoramio.com

Volcanoes of Heard Island and McDonald Islands
Active volcanoes
Complex volcanoes